Saltlick Creek or Salt Lick Creek may refer to:

Salt Lick Creek (Kentucky)
Saltlick Creek (Cheat River), a tributary of the Cheat River in West Virginia
Saltlick Creek (Little Kanawha River), a tributary of the Little Kanawha River in West Virginia
Salt Lick Creek (Susquehanna River), a tributary of the Susquehanna River in Pennsylvania